The Mohammed V Foundation for Solidarity  was established and inaugurated by The King of Morocco Mohammed VI in 1999 when he was prince. The foundation was recognized as a public utility entity under a Decree issued in July 1999.

Under the banner of "Ready to help the needy", it has been involved, jointly with other social players, in the fight against poverty and social problems.

The Foundation  enjoyed consultative status at the United Nations Economic and Social Council.

Cultural solidarity: volunteering and donation 
3.3 billion Moroccan dirham disbursed or earmarked for projects achieved or underway since the Foundation's creation.

Seeking to give the culture of solidarity its full meaning and to get all good will parties involved in its programs and activities, the Foundation initiated the setting up of “volunteering” networks, putting special emphasis an youth and more particularly students.

regular donors of the foundation: a hundred loyal donors as part of a support committee: industrial, hoteliers, farmers, agribusiness, ship owners, holding companies, bankers and insurers, service provider, international foundations and patrons of various international foundations.

Standing committee of support

See also
Voluntary association

References

External links
 Official website

Non-profit organizations based in Morocco
Organizations established in 1999
1999 establishments in Morocco
Poverty-related organizations